Raamdeo Agrawal is an Indian businessman, stock market investor and Chairman of Motilal Oswal Group which he co-founded with Motilal Oswal in 1987. According to Forbes he had a net worth of $1 billion in 2018 but dropped off their list of billionaires in 2019.

Life
Agrawal was born in a middle-class Marwari family.Raamdeo is a Chartered Accountant from Institute of Chartered Accountants of India  He was brought up in a village in Chhattisgarh. He moved to Mumbai to study to become a  chartered accountant.His ancestors belong to Rajasthan He is married to Mrs Sunita Agarwal and together they have a son Vaibhav Agarwal.  In a dramatic turn of events two kidnappers had taken away Vaibhav from his hostel in Kota when he as preparing for IIT entrance. The kidnappers demanded a ransom of Rs 10 crore from Agarwal. Later after joint operation by police across 6 states, after 15 days Vaibhav was rescued by the police arrested when they arrested the driver of the kidnappers.

Career
Agrawal pursued chartered accountancy in Mumbai and began his career as a sub-broker in 1987. He co-founded Motilal Oswal Financial Services and his family today owns about 36% of the company.  In 1986, he wrote the book Corporate Numbers Game, along with co-author Ram K Piparia. He also authored the book The Art of Wealth Creation. Agrawal was awarded the Rashtriya Samman Patra by Central Board of Direct Taxes for a consistent track record of highest integrity in tax payments for a period of 5 years from FY95-FY99.He considers Warren Buffett as his mentor and says that his investment strategy is largely inspired by him.

Investments 
By the time Agarwal became a sub broker, he was able to build a portfolio of 10 lac. This grew to almost 30 crore during the bull run of Harshad Mehta scam of the 1990s however it fell to 10 crore after the scam was exposed. Later he went to the US to meet his inspiration Mr Warren Buffett. Here he made a point to study all the letters of Buffett written to his company Berkshire Hathway. Until this point he held 225 stocks in his portfolio which he later scaled down to just 15 stocks. Eventually by the year 2000, his portfolio grew to Rs 100 crore. Some of his notable and early investments were Hero Honda, Infosys and Eicher motors.

References

Indian businesspeople
Living people
Year of birth missing (living people)
Indian investors
Indian accountants

Rajasthani people